Thayi Karulu (Kannada: ತಾಯಿ ಕರುಳು) is a 1962 Indian Kannada film, directed and produced by G. V. Iyer. The film stars Kalyan Kumar, Udaykumar and M. V. Rajamma in the lead roles. The film has musical score by G. K. Venkatesh. The movie is based on the Bengali novel Ulka by Nihar Ranjan Gupta which was also later adapted in Tamil in 1969 as Deiva Magan starring Sivaji Ganesan. G. V. Iyer - Kalyan Kumar combo went on to remake the movie in Tamil in 1965 as Thayin Karunai.

Cast
Kalyan Kumar
Udaykumar
M. V. Rajamma
B.vijayalaxmi

Soundtrack
The music was composed by G. K. Venkatesh.

References

External links
 

1962 films
Films scored by G. K. Venkatesh
1960s Kannada-language films
Films based on works by Nihar Ranjan Gupta